Sticklinge udde is a locality situated in Lidingö Municipality, Stockholm County, Sweden with 2,943 inhabitants in 2010. The locality corresponds to the northern part of Sticklinge.

References 

Populated places in Lidingö Municipality